Lancaster County may refer to:

 Lancaster County, Nebraska, United States
 Lancaster County, Pennsylvania, United States
 Lancaster County, South Carolina, United States
 Lancaster County, Virginia, United States

See also
 County of Lancaster, England,  now Lancashire